Cemmaes Road is a village in Powys, Wales. It is in the community (civil parish) of Glantwymyn.

The village was named in English after the now-closed  station on the Newtown and Machynlleth Railway, now part of the Cambrian Line. Cemmes Road was also the junction with the Mawddwy Railway.

The Welsh name for the village, and for the community, is Glantwymyn, as it lies on the River Twymyn. According to the United Kingdom Census 2001, the population of the community is 1,072, increasing to 1,185 at the 2011 Census.

The village of Cemmaes is  miles to the northeast. Cemmaes Road lies at the junction of the major A470 and A489 roads. The historic Mathafarn Hall is less than  mile north-west of Cemmaes Road.

Ysgol Glantwymyn primary school is located in the village.

Governance
An electoral ward in the Welsh name exists, which also covers the neighbouring community of Cadfarch. The ward had a population of 2,040 at the 2011 Census.

Welsh Language
According to the 2001 census, 58.5% of the people in the community can speak the Welsh language. The age group with the highest number of Welsh speakers is the 15-year-olds, where every 15-year-old could speak the language.

References

External links
The former railway station
www.geograph.co.uk : photos of Cemmaes Road / Glantwymyn & surrounding area

Villages in Powys
Glantwymyn